Ser bonita no basta (English title:Beauty is not enough) is a Venezuelan telenovela written by Perla Farías and  produced by RCTV in 2005.

Marjorie de Sousa and Ricardo Álamo star as the main protagonists while Fedra López and Hugo Vásquez star as the main antagonists.

Plot 
Coral Torres, Topacio Martínez and Esmeralda Falcón are three half-sisters who are completely unaware of each other's existence and of the fact that their father, Asdrúbal Torres, is still alive. The only thing that links them is a birthmark in the shape of a crescent. Asdrúbal, an irresponsible man, left his family years ago, and has now return to the country to look for his family and ask for their forgiveness.

Coral, the only legitimate daughter of Asdrúbal, is a young woman of captivating beauty and an aspiring model. But her life has been constrained by her domineering mother Soledad who wants to fulfill her dream of dominating the fashion world through her daughter. Soledad will do anything to see her wishes come true, and she even conspires to break up Coral and the love of her life, Alejandro Mendoza, who remains unaware that Coral is expecting his child.

Topacio grew up in an orphanage and has been eternally marked by the death of her brother Tomás. She rises to fame by becoming a beauty pageant winner and dreams of starting a family with Orlando, an ambitious man who uses Topacio's fame and beauty for his own gain. But when he betrays her, Topacio will discover the high price one has to pay for beauty.

Esmeralda, the youngest of the sisters, is shy and awkward girl who is a victim of her evil step-sisters. Despite her step-sister's envy, she leaves her childhood home once she discovers her father is alive, and sets off to search for him and fulfill her dream of being a fashion designer. All three sisters are incredibly beautiful in their own way, but nevertheless miserable in their private life.

Cast 
Marjorie de Sousa as Coral Torres Olavarría
Ricardo Álamo as Alejandro Mendoza 
Fedra López as Soledad Olavarría 
Javier Vidal as Asdrúbal Torres 
Flávia Gleske as Topacio Martínez 
Ricardo Bianchi as Julián Mendoza 'El Duque' 
Marianela González as Esmeralda Falcón 
Sebastián Falco as  Benjamín Eskenazi 
Alejandro Otero as  Francisco Arias  
Marlene Maseda as Carmela Guerra 
Hugo Vásquez as Orlando Álvarez 
Adolfo Cubas as Justo Olavarría  
Juan Carlos Baena as Eduardo Márquez  
Ernesto Balzi as  Ezequiel Villavicencio  
Beatriz Vásquez as Teresa de Mendoza  
Leopoldo Regnault as  Reynaldo Mantilla  
Alejandro Mata as Don Ramiro Campos  
Nathalie Cortez as  Etelvina Martínez  
Gioia Lombardini as  Doña Consuelo Rojas  
Sandy Olivares as Darío Peña  
Maria Antonieta Castillo as  Elena 'Lala' Tirado 
Ana Gabriela Barboza as  Jazmín Falcón  
Lolymar Sanchez as Rosa 'Rosita' Falcón    
Carmen Alicia Lara as  Eilín Campos  
Anabella Troconis-Neri as  Isabelina Villavicencio  
María Gabriela de Faría as Andreína Márquez  
Verónica Cortez as  Margot de Falcón 
César Román as Ramón Seijas 'Ramsés'  
Crisol Carabal as  Michelle  
Dora Mazzone as Betty Marrero  
Ligia Petit as Gala
Édgar Ramírez as Leonardo

References

External links

Opening credits

2005 telenovelas
Venezuelan telenovelas
RCTV telenovelas
2005 Venezuelan television series debuts
2005 Venezuelan television series endings
Spanish-language telenovelas
Television shows set in Caracas